Winners of the West is a 1921 American silent Western film serial directed by Edward Laemmle. This serial is considered to be a lost film.

Cast
 Art Acord as Arthur Standish / The Mysterious Spaniard
 Myrtle Lind as Betty Edwards
 Burton Law as John C. Fremont (credited as Burton C. Law)
 J. Herbert Frank as Squire Blair (credited as Bert Frank)
 Burton S. Wilson as Dr. Edwards (credited as Burt Wilson)
 Jim Corey as Godney
 Scott Pembroke as Louis Blair (credited as Percy Pembroke)
 Bob Kortman as Sioux Warrior (uncredited)

Chapter titles
Power of Gold
Blazing Arrow
Perils of the Plains
The Flame of Hate
The Fight for a Fortune
Buried Alive
Fires of Fury
Pit of Doom
Chasm of Peril
Sands of Fear
Poisoned Pool
Duel in the Night
Web of Fate
Trail of Mystery
Unmasked
Hidden Gold
Cave of Terror
The End of the Trail

See also
 List of film serials
 List of film serials by studio
 List of lost films

References

External links

 

1921 films
1921 lost films
1921 Western (genre) films
American silent serial films
American black-and-white films
Lost Western (genre) films
Universal Pictures film serials
Films directed by Edward Laemmle
Lost American films
Silent American Western (genre) films
1920s American films
1920s English-language films